United Nations Security Council Resolution 1708, adopted unanimously on September 14, 2006, after recalling previous resolutions on the situation in Côte d'Ivoire (Ivory Coast), particularly resolutions 1572 (2004), 1584 (2004), 1633 (2005) and 1643 (2005), the Council prolonged the mandate of an expert group monitoring an arms embargo against the country until mid-December 2006.

Details
The Security Council welcomed the efforts of the Secretary-General Kofi Annan, the African Union and the Economic Community of West African States (ECOWAS) towards re-establishing peace and stability in Côte d'Ivoire. It determined that the situation in the country continued to pose a threat to international peace and security.

Under Chapter VII of the United Nations Charter, the mandate of the expert group monitoring sanctions was renewed until December 15, 2006. The expert group was required to submit an update on the implementation of resolutions 1572 and 1643 and make appropriate recommendations.

See also
 First Ivorian Civil War
 List of United Nations Security Council Resolutions 1701 to 1800 (2006–2008)
 Opération Licorne
 United Nations Operation in Côte d'Ivoire

References

External links
 
Text of the Resolution at undocs.org

 1708
 1708
2006 in Ivory Coast
September 2006 events